M-phase inducer phosphatase 2 is an enzyme that in humans is encoded by the CDC25B gene.

CDC25B is a member of the CDC25 family of phosphatases. CDC25B activates the cyclin dependent kinase CDC2 by removing two phosphate groups and it is required for entry into mitosis. CDC25B shuttles between the nucleus and the cytoplasm due to nuclear localization and nuclear export signals. The protein is nuclear in the M and G1 phases of the cell cycle and moves to the cytoplasm during S and G2. CDC25B has oncogenic properties, although its role in tumor formation has not been determined. Multiple transcript variants for this gene exist.

Interactions
CDC25B has been shown to interact with MAPK14, Casein kinase 2, alpha 1, CHEK1, MELK, Estrogen receptor alpha, YWHAB, YWHAZ, YWHAH and YWHAE.

References

Further reading

External links
 

Enzymes